Alloclita subitariella is a moth in the family Cosmopterigidae. It was described by Riedl in 1993. It is found in Saudi Arabia.

References

Natural History Museum Lepidoptera generic names catalog

Antequerinae
Moths described in 1993
Moths of Asia